Magnolia wolfii is a  tree species in the family Magnoliaceae. It is endemic to Colombia.  
The species is recorded only from one locality in Risaralda Department. The species is being investigated by a conservation and propagation research program implemented by the Technological University of Pereira, with the support of Botanic Gardens Conservation International.

In August 2006 scientists visited the small two hectare patch of forest where M. wolfii was known to grow. They found the area to be girded on all sides by plantations of coffee, and only three adult trees growing there, apparently bearing flowers and fruits, but no saplings.

References

External links
 Magnolia wolfii at Botanic Gardens Conservation International

wolfii
Plants described in 1994
Endemic flora of Colombia
Critically endangered plants
Taxonomy articles created by Polbot